Mykhaylo Mykhaylovich Mykhalyna  (15 March 1924 – 30 August 1998) was a Czechoslovakian, Hungarian, Ukrainian and Soviet professional football player, Soviet-Ukrainian football manager and coach. He was the Master of Sports of USSR (1952) and the Honoured Masters of Sport of the USSR (1955). From 1977 to 1983 and 1991 to 1995 he was the president of the Football Federation of Zakarpattia Oblast.

Honours
 Soviet Cup winner: 1954.
 Silver medal of USSR Championship: 1952.
 In the list of the 33 best players (twice №2): 1952

International career
Aside from being named one of the 33 best players in the USSR for 1952, Mykhalyna made his debut for USSR-2 on 26 September 1954 in a friendly against Hungary.

See also
Other famous Soviet Magyar footballers:
 Yozhef Betsa
 Fedir Medvid
 Vasyl Rats
 Yozhef Szabo

References

External links
  Profile
  In memoriam: Mykhaylo Mykhalyna
  In memoriam: Mykhaylo Mykhalyna

1924 births
1998 deaths
People from Carpathian Ruthenia
Soviet people of Hungarian descent
Ukrainian people of Hungarian descent
Soviet footballers
Ukrainian footballers
Soviet football managers
Ukrainian football managers
Association football defenders
Association football midfielders
Honoured Masters of Sport of the USSR
FC Hoverla Uzhhorod players
FC Dynamo Kyiv players
FC Hoverla Uzhhorod managers
FC Spartak Ivano-Frankivsk managers
FC Bukovyna Chernivtsi managers
Sportspeople from Zakarpattia Oblast